Pseudotaxus chienii, the whiteberry yew, is a species of plant in the yew family, Taxaceae. It is the sole species in the genus Pseudotaxus, but closely related to the other yews in the genus Taxus. It is endemic to southern China, occurring in northern Guangdong, northern Guangxi, Hunan, Southwest Jiangxi and southern Zhejiang.

Like other yews, it is a small coniferous shrub or small tree, reaching 2–5 m tall with reddish bark. The leaves are lanceolate, flat, 1–2.6 cm long and 2–3 mm broad, dark green above, with two white stomatal bands below; they are arranged spirally on the stem, but with the leaf bases twisted to align the leaves in two flat rows either side of the stem. The conspicuous white stomatal bands on the harder, stiffer (less soft) leaves readily distinguish it from the yews in the genus Taxus.

It is dioecious, with the male and female cones on different trees. The female (seed) cones are very similar to those of Taxus species, but the aril is white when mature, not red; they are 5–7 mm long and wide. The male (pollen) cones are globose, 3–4 mm diameter.

It is grown as an ornamental plant in southern China and occasionally elsewhere.

References

External links
Flora of China
Arboretum de Villardebelle: photos of young cultivated plant

Taxaceae
Endemic flora of China
Flora of Guangdong
Flora of Guangxi
Flora of Hunan
Flora of Jiangxi
Flora of Zhejiang
Trees of China
Vulnerable plants
Monotypic conifer genera
Dioecious plants